Puffin Island, Newfoundland and Labrador may refer to:

 Puffin Island (Baccalieu Tickle), Newfoundland and Labrador, Canada
 Puffin Island (Greenspond), Newfoundland and Labrador, Canada